"You Remind Me" is a song by American singer-songwriter Mary J. Blige. It served as Blige's first single from her debut album, What's the 411? (1992). Written by Eric Milteer and produced by Dave "Jam" Hall, it was originally used on the soundtrack of 1991 comedy film Strictly Business. The song marked Blige's first top forty hit, reaching number twenty-nine on the Billboard Hot 100 and number one on the Hot R&B Singles chart. The music video was released in 1992. The song also sampled Patrice Rushen’s 1982 song, ‘Remind Me’.

Critical reception
J.D. Considine from The Baltimore Sun complimented the "smooth, soulful balladry" of "You Remind Me". Havelock Nelson from Entertainment Weekly noted its "cascading, intricately layered mid-tempo beat". James Hamilton from Music Weeks RM Dance Update described it as a "slinky groin grinder". Parry Gettelman from Orlando Sentinel wrote, "Blige's voice swoops and croons wonderfully on her big hit, "You Remind Me". The tune is built around a nice little phrase but wouldn't really go anywhere if it weren't for the funky hip-hop beat."

Track listings

 US Cassette single "You Remind Me" (Radio version) – 4:15
 "You Remind Me" (Extended instrumental) – 5:08

 US Cassette maxi-single and CD single "You Remind Me" (Daddy Hip Hop) – 5:56
 "You Remind Me" (Bentley's) – 4:43
 "You Remind Me" (AD's Radio) – 5:12
 "You Remind Me" (Jazz mix) – 5:15

 US 12-inch single "You Remind Me" (Daddy Hip Hop) – 5:56
 "You Remind Me" (AD's Radio) – 5:12
 "You Remind Me" (Bentley's) – 4:43

 UK 7-inch single (1992) "You Remind Me" (Album version) – 4:15
 "You Remind Me" (Bentley's) – 4:43

 UK 12-inch single (1992) "You Remind Me" (Daddy Hip Hop) – 5:56
 "Leave a Message" (Album version) – 3:38
 "You Remind Me" (AD's Radio) – 5:12
 "You Remind Me" (Bentley's) – 4:43

 UK CD single (1992) "You Remind Me" (Album version) – 4:15
 "You Remind Me" (Bentley's) – 4:43
 "Leave a Message" (Album version) – 3:38
 "You Remind Me" (Daddy Hip Hop) – 5:56

 UK Cassette single (1993) "You Remind Me" (Straight to the Heart radio edit) – 3:19
 "You Remind Me" (Album version) – 4:15

 UK CD single – CD1 (1993) "You Remind Me" (Straight to the Heart radio edit) – 3:19
 "You Remind Me" (Straight to the Heart mix) – 5:41
 "You Remind Me" (Album version) – 4:15
 "You Remind Me" (AD's Radio) – 5:12

 UK CD single – CD2 (1993)'''
 "You Remind Me" (Bentley's) – 4:43
 "You Remind Me" (Phat remix) – 5:37
 "Love No Limit" (Puff Daddy remix) – 3:57
 "Love No Limit" (Bad Boy mix) – 3:58

Credits and personnel
Credits are adapted from the What's the 411?'' liner notes.
 Sean "Puffy" Combs – executive producer
 Dave "Jam" Hall – producer
 Andre Harrell – executive producer
 Eric Milteer – songwriting

Charts

Weekly charts

Year-end charts

Certifications

Release history

See also
 List of number-one R&B singles of 1992 (U.S.)

References

1991 songs
1992 debut singles
Mary J. Blige songs
Song recordings produced by Dave Hall (record producer)
Uptown Records singles